Bolton Interchange is a transport interchange combining Bolton railway station and Bolton Bus Station
in the town of Bolton in Greater Manchester, England. The station is located on the Manchester to Preston line and the Ribble Valley line, and is managed by Northern Trains. Ticket gates have been in operation at the station since 2016.

The railway station was originally named Bolton Trinity Street to differentiate it from nearby Bolton Great Moor Street station which closed in 1954. The station was also known as "Bridgeman Street Station" and "Bradford Square Station".

From the railway station, there are frequent services to Manchester Victoria, Manchester Piccadilly, Clitheroe via Blackburn, Wigan North Western, and Preston. Services operating to Victoria and Piccadilly operate through and terminate at other regional stations, such as Manchester Airport and Stalybridge. There is 1 train per weekday from Southport to Leeds. There is no return service.

The entrance and ticket office are at street level, at which there is a footbridge to the bus station and a taxi rank. A walkway leads to the platforms which are in a cutting. The main island platform has a buffet. The original main station building was demolished in the 1980s, but the Victorian buildings survive on the platforms. The clock tower was dismantled and rebuilt next to the new station.

History
Trinity Street station opened when the Manchester and Bolton Railway completed its route to Salford Central in 1838. The line extended to Manchester Victoria in 1843.  This line was extended to Preston by the Bolton and Preston Railway in 1841. The route northwards, now the Ribble Valley Line, to Blackburn followed four years later, whilst the Liverpool and Bury Railway's arrival in 1848 gave the town links eastward to Bury and Rochdale, and westwards to Wigan and Liverpool. These lines had all become part of the Lancashire and Yorkshire Railway system by 1858.

The network of routes radiating from Bolton has remained largely unchanged to this day, the one exception being the line to Rochdale which closed on 5 October 1970. Through trains to Liverpool ended in 1977 with the closure of Liverpool Exchange station, but the line to Wigan remains open. Trains to Manchester Piccadilly and beyond began running in May 1988 with the opening of the Windsor Link.

Automatic ticket barriers have been operational at the station since 12 December 2016.  Northern (Arriva Rail North Limited) had announced its intention to install them here (and at several other locations) earlier in the year.

Platforms
The station currently has five platforms in use.

 Platform 2 is situated at the southern end of the station and allows for trains from the Manchester stations to terminate at Bolton. It is also used for stabling units from Manchester in the evening, and a couple of units use this platform in a morning. 
 Platform 3 is used for trains heading to Manchester Victoria, Manchester Piccadilly, Manchester Airport, Rochdale, Stockport and  though it is also signalled for use by northbound trains to Blackburn.
 Platform 4 is used for trains heading north and west including Wigan, Southport, Kirkby, Preston, Blackpool, Barrow-in-Furness, and Windermere.  It was temporarily closed in the autumn of 2017 for refurbishment work, but is now operational again.
 Platform 5 is used for trains to the same destinations as platform 4.

In the early 1990s, Bolton's old Platform 5 was used for the Red Star Parcels service. This was separated from Platform 4 by a brick wall and the track had been concreted over to form a car park for passenger use.  Parking facilities here were closed permanently on 24 January 2017.

The old platform 5 was rebuilt to increase capacity and opened on 6 September 2017. The work to install signals and overhead cables was completed in the autumn of 2018.

Refurbishment

In 2005 and 2006, part of the station and its surrounding area underwent major refurbishment.
The walkway between the ticket office and platforms was modernised along with the station lifts and stairs. Bolton Interchange which serves as a direct connection between bus and rail to certain districts of Bolton was rebuilt, incorporating a taxi rank. The bridge connecting Newport Street with the rest of the town centre was also rebuilt, along with a large arch, which is clearly noticeable in the Bolton skyline.

In 2006 a proposal to refurbish the station toilets, waiting rooms, ticket office and platforms was rejected due to lack of funds. In March 2010, GMPTE launched a consultation which proposed relocating Bolton bus station from Moor Lane to a new site adjacent to Bolton Interchange to improve connections between bus and train services. Refurbishment work on the ticket office, platforms and cafe commenced on 15 November 2010.

The new interchange, built on land bounded by Newport Street and Great Moor Street, replaced the old Moor Lane bus station and provides vastly improved waiting areas, passenger facilities, information, safety and security. It directly connects bus and rail services via a Skylink pedestrian footbridge, improving transport links, as well as access to the town centre.

The new interchange will offer enhanced accessibility with a modern concourse and passenger facilities including a retail outlet, cycle hub, shop mobility, café and modern public toilets including adult and baby changing facilities. It will also make use of innovative sustainable energy initiatives, including rainwater recycling to flush the toilets, solar panels, air source heat pumps and low-energy LED lighting.

The new transport interchange was delivered by Kier Construction for TfGM in partnership with Bolton Council. The £48 million scheme was funded by the Greater Manchester Transport Fund and supports the Bolton Town Centre Transport Strategy and the wider town centre regeneration plans.

Electrification
From May 2015 until December 2015, to facilitate the electrification of the route from Manchester to Preston a reduced service pattern was in place as only one track through the Farnworth Tunnel could be used due to its re-boring to accommodate twin tracks. During this period, many TransPennine Express services were re-routed via Wigan North Western avoiding Bolton altogether. At the weekends train services between Manchester and Bolton were replaced by buses. In April 2016, in preparation for electrification, Orlando St. bridge was replaced, Soho St. bridge was demolished and track lowering took place in the Bullfield Tunnels area.

Another 15 day blockade took place between 12–27 August 2017 to permit further work at the station, including the reinstatement of platform 5 (as noted), erecting a new footbridge, installation of overhead wiring and signalling upgrades.  Buses replaced trains on most routes, with through services diverted via Atherton or Wigan North Western.  The work was completed on schedule on 28 August, but the line towards Manchester remained closed following the work due to an embankment collapse and bridge damage at Moses Gate caused by a burst water main.  As a result, the only service running was that to and from Blackburn, with other trains diverted away and replacement bus services to Manchester, Wigan and Preston in place.  The line reopened to traffic on 6 September 2017 upon completion of the repairs to the bridge supports and embankment and normal working resumed on all routes.

The electrification work at the station was due to be completed in time for the December 2017 timetable change, which would have seen a major revamp of the service pattern in operation.  The work however fell well behind schedule, with Network Rail admitting in January 2018 that the work would not even be completed in time for the next timetable change in May.  This was due to unexpected problems with poor ground conditions in several locations, which meant that some 200 masts for the overhead wires could not be installed as planned.  In order to complete the remaining work by the end of the year (both piling for the masts and the actual wiring), further weekend blockades were imposed by Network Rail, which were expected to continue until November 2018 (along with a nine-day line closure in late August). The planned timetable revamp (including the return of Glasgow and Edinburgh trains and through services to south Manchester and Cheshire) have also had to be postponed until May 2019 as many of these improvements were dependent on the availability of electric rolling stock.

The first overnight electric test trains ran successfully in December 2018. Electric service commenced on 11 February 2019 utilising Class 319 Electric Multiple Units.

Services

Rail

As of December 2022, the typical off-peak service is:

Northern Trains
2tph to 
2tph to 
1tph to 
3tph to 
1tph to 
2tph to  via 

TransPennine Express
These trains are pick-up only northbound and set-down only southbound, so passengers cannot use these trains for journeys between Bolton and Manchester.

Bus
Several bus companies provide a comprehensive route network of services around Bolton and the surrounding areas, with some subsidised on behalf of Transport for Greater Manchester: Arriva North West, Stagecoach Manchester, Stagecoach Merseyside & South Lancashire, Tyrers, Diamond Bus North West, Blackburn Bus Company, Vision Bus, and Rosso.

Notes

Bibliography

External links

Northern franchise railway stations
Railway stations in the Metropolitan Borough of Bolton
DfT Category C1 stations
Former Lancashire and Yorkshire Railway stations
Railway stations in Great Britain opened in 1838
Bus stations in Greater Manchester
1838 establishments in England
Buildings and structures in Bolton
Railway stations served by TransPennine Express